Berestov may refer to:

 Berestov, Belarus
 Dmitry Berestov (born 1980), Russian weightlifter